The Dingo Fence or Dog Fence is a pest-exclusion fence in Australia to keep dingoes out of the relatively fertile south-east part of the continent (where they have largely been exterminated) and protect the sheep flocks of southern Queensland. It is one of the longest structures in the world. It stretches  from Jimbour on the Darling Downs near Dalby through thousands of kilometres of arid land ending west of Eyre peninsula on cliffs of the Nullarbor Plain above the Great Australian Bight near Nundroo. It has been partly successful, though dingoes can still be found in parts of the southern states. Although the fence has helped reduce losses of sheep to predators, this has been countered by holes in fences found in the 1990s through which dingo offspring have passed and by increased pasture competition from rabbits and kangaroos.

History

The earliest pest exclusion fences in Australia were created to protect small plots of cropland from the predation by marsupials.  In the 1860s and 1870s, introduced rabbit populations began to spread rapidly across southern Australia.  By 1884, a rabbit-proof fence was built.  Having been unsuccessful at keeping rabbits out, and more successful at keeping out pigs, kangaroos, emus and brumbies, and as more sheep farms were established, the interest for a dingo-proof barrier increased enough that government funds were being used to heighten and expand the fence. In 1930, an estimated 32,000 km of dog netting in Queensland alone was being used on top of rabbit fences.  Prior to 1948, the idea of a Dingo Barrier Fence Scheme had not come into fruition as a statewide project for which annual maintenance and repair were kept. Since this time, there have been pushes to move away from a method of barrier-exclusion to complete extinction of the dingo and wild-dog cross-breeds.  Poisoning the species with compound 1080 (sodium monofluoroacetate) baits has been seen as a much cheaper alternative than fence maintenance.  A compromise in the form of the continued use of poison and the shortening of the fence from its previous length of over 8000 km has been made.

In 2009 as part of the Q150 celebrations, the dingo fence was announced as one of the Q150 Icons of Queensland for its role as an iconic "innovation and invention".

In 2011 the Liberal MP for Stuart, Dan van Holst Pellekaan, called for a  bounty on dingoes.

Geography
The  section of the fence in Queensland is also known as the Great Barrier Fence or Wild Dog Barrier Fence 11. It is administered by the Department of Agriculture and Fisheries.  The Wild Dog Barrier Fence staff consists of 23 employees, including two-person teams that patrol a  section of the fence once every week. There are depots at Quilpie and Roma.

The Queensland Border Fence stretches for  westwards along the border with New South Wales, into the Strzelecki Desert. The fence passes the point where the three states of Queensland, New South Wales and South Australia meet (Cameron Corner). At this point, it connects with the South Australian Border Fence, which runs for  southwards along the border with New South Wales, these two sections are managed by the New South Wales Wild Dog Destruction Board.

Physical design
The fence varies in construction. The fence line on both sides is cleared to a  width. Sheep and cattle stations protected by the fence are exceptionally large.

Parts of the Dingo Fence are lit at night by  cold cathode fluorescent lamps which are alternately red and white. They are powered by long life batteries which are charged by photovoltaic cells during the day. At minor and farm crossings, a series of gates allow vehicles to pass through the fence. Where the fence intersects major roads and highways, cattle grids are used to allow high-speed vehicles through.

Environmental impact

It seems that there are fewer kangaroos and emus on the northwestern side of the fence where the dingoes are, suggesting that the dingoes' presence reduces the populations of those animals. It has also been suggested that the larger kangaroo populations inside the fence have been caused by the lack of dingo predation, and competition for food leads to lower sheep stocking rates than would be possible without the fence.

Believed to have been introduced into Australia by Aboriginal peoples between 4,600 and 18,300 years ago, the dingo's status as a native or introduced species in Australia has been a controversy.  According to Mike Letnic of UNSW, the dingo, as Australia's top predator, has an important role in maintaining the balance of nature. Where dingoes had been excluded by the fence, Letnic found reduced biodiversity, with fewer native mammals. 

Although the fence has helped reduce the loss of sheep to predators, the exclusion of dingoes has allowed for increased pasture competition from rabbits, kangaroos and emus. Sheep are being lost to increasing numbers of feral dogs.

Drone and satellite technology have illustrated how removing dingos changes vegetation growth.

See also 

 Agricultural fencing
 Rabbit-proof fence
Separation barrier
 Temporary fencing

Gallery

References

Further reading

1885 establishments in Australia
Fences
Borders of Queensland
Borders of New South Wales
Borders of South Australia
Infrastructure completed in 1885
Agriculture in New South Wales
Agriculture in Queensland
Agriculture in South Australia
Canis lupus dingo